Barry Cox is an Australian former rugby league footballer who played in the 1970s.

Barry Cox was graded with St George Dragons, along with his brother Russell Cox from the Renown United juniors. Cox played two seasons at St. George before moving to Newtown for four seasons and gave great service to the Jets. He retired from first grade football in 1977.

References

1949 births
Living people
Australian rugby league players
St. George Dragons players
Newtown Jets players
Rugby league fullbacks
Rugby league players from Sydney